Loren A. Smith (born December 22, 1944) is a senior judge of the United States Court of Federal Claims.  He served as the court's Chief Judge from 1986 to 2000.

Early life, education, and career
Smith was born on December 22, 1944, in Chicago and earned his Bachelor of Arts and Juris Doctor from Northwestern University and Northwestern University School of Law, respectively.

He served as the University of Denver College of Law's first Distinguished Jurist-in-Residence. In 1995, Smith was presented with the Allen Chair from the University of Richmond School of Law, Richmond, VA; an Honorary L.L.D. from John Marshall Law School, Atlanta, GA; and, the Romanian Medal of Justice, presented by the Romanian Minister of Justice. He was awarded an Honorary L.L.D. from Capital University Law School, Columbus, Ohio in 1996 and Campbell University, The Norman Adrian Wiggins School of Law, Buies Creek, NC in 1997.

Smith formerly served as chairman of the Administrative Conference of the United States (1981–85), during which time he was also a member of the president's Cabinet Councils on Legal Policy and on Management and Administration. He also served as the chairman of the Council of Independent Regulatory Agencies. Smith was deputy director of the Executive Branch Management Office of Presidential Transition (1980–81); chief counsel, Reagan for President campaigns (1976 and 1980); professor of law, Delaware Law School (1976–84); special assistant U.S. attorney for the District of Columbia (1974–75); assistant to the special counsel to the president (1973–74); general attorney, Federal Communications Commission (1973); and consultant, Sidley & Austin, Chicago (1972–73).

Smith is adjunct professor of law at George Mason University School of Law; Washington
College of Law, American University; Georgetown University Law Center; and Columbus School of Law, The Catholic University of America. He taught as an adjunct professor of law at The International School of Law (now George Mason University School of Law), 1973–74.

Federal judicial service
Smith was appointed a judge of the United States Court of Federal Claims by President Ronald Reagan on July 11, 1985, and entered duty on September 12, 1985. He was designated Chief Judge on January 14, 1986, also by President Reagan. After serving 15 years as Chief Judge, Smith took senior status on July 10, 2000.

Publications
Smith is author of the following:
The Morality of Regulation, William & Mary Environmental Law and Policy Review, 1998
The Aging of Administrative Law: The Administrative Conference Reaches Early Retirement, Arizona State Law Journal, 1998
Renovation of an Old Court, Federal Bar News and Journal, September 1993; A Spring Thaw in Estonia, The Washington Times, April 11, 1992
Administration: An Idea Whose Time May Have Passed, in The Fettered Presidency, eds. L. Gordon Crovitz & Jeremy A. Rabkin, 1989
Vision of the Exchange, William & Mary Law Review, 1986
Judicialization of the Administrative Process: The Fine Print, National Legal Center for the Public Interest, 1986
The End of the Constitution, 4 Detroit College of Law Review 1147 (1986)
Judicialization: The Twilight of Administrative Law, 85 Duke L.J. 2 (1985)
Judicial Review of Administrative Decisions, 7 Harvard Journal of Law and Public Policy 61 (1984)
Business, Buck$ & Bull, The Corporation, The First Amendment & The Corrupt Practice of Law, 4 Delaware Journal of Corporate Law 1 (1978)
He is co-author of Black America and Organized Labor: A Fair Deal?, The Lincoln Institute for Research and Education (1979).

Memberships
He is a member of the Bars of the Supreme Court of Illinois; U.S. Court of Appeals for the Armed Forces; United States Court of Appeals, D.C. Circuit; United States Supreme Court; United States Court of Appeals for the Federal Circuit; United States Court of Federal Claims. Smith is an Honorary Member of the Bar Association of the District of Columbia and was the recipient of their Judicial Honoree Award for 1997.

Smith is an Honorary Member of the University Club of Washington, D.C. where he serves as chairman of the Centennial Committee. In 1991, he received the club's Member of the Year Award. He is also chairman of the WETA Community Advisory Board. At the 1997 National Property Rights Conference, he was presented with The Ronald Reagan Public Service Award. In 1993, Smith was presented with the Presidential Medal by The Catholic University of America.

Personal life and other activities
He is married to the former Catherine (Kitty) Yore; two sons, Loren Jr. and Adam (1980–1997). Smith is an amateur magician. One of his signature tricks involves a magic coloring book.

Smith has served as an international elections observer in Chile and Serbia. He has spoken and appeared on TV and radio in Estonia, The Republic of South Africa, Zambia, Kenya, The Czech Republic, Hungary, Turkey, Egypt, Pakistan, the Philippines, Singapore, Italy, Germany, England, Canada, Spain, Switzerland, and Ukraine on behalf of the United States Information Agency and other groups. In 2007, Smith traveled to Thailand to advise the writers of the new Thai constitution.

References

External links 

|-

Judges of the United States Court of Federal Claims
United States Article I federal judges appointed by Ronald Reagan
20th-century American judges
University of Denver faculty
University of Richmond faculty
Northwestern University Pritzker School of Law alumni
Columbus School of Law faculty
Lawyers from Chicago
1944 births
Living people
Northwestern University alumni